A custom home is a one-of-a-kind house that is designed for a specific client and for a particular location. The custom home builder may use plans created by an architect or by a professional home designer. Custom homes provide consumers with the opportunity to control layout, lot size, and accessibility.

In most cases, custom home builders construct on land the home buyer already owns. Some developers sell fully serviced lots specifically for the construction of custom homes. This makes it easy to build a custom home since the lot is construction-ready and builders can focus purely on the design of the home.

4 main types of home builders

Production home builders
Only builds on land the builder owns.
Tend to use stock plans, but usually offer a variety of plan choices, upgrades and options.
Build all types of housing — single-family, condos, town houses, and rental properties.
Are large-volume builders.
Generally build for all price points.
Cost is usually the lowest of all homes built = $

Semi-Custom home builders

Utilizes 'stock or standard' home plans that can be customized with a limited number of options for selections.
Build on land already owned or the builder owns. 
Does not typically require an architect.
Build single-family homes.
More affordable but less flexibility.
Cost is usually slightly more than production homes = $$

Custom home builders

Build on land already owned. Some custom builders also build on land they own which is known as a spec home – short for speculative.
Build unique houses. A custom home is a site-specific home built from a unique set of plans for the wishes of a specific client. 
Generally works collaboratively with an architect.  Some custom builders may offer design/build services.
Build single-family homes.
Are generally small-volume builders.
Tend to build high-end homes.
Cost is usually more than production or semi-custom = $$$

Fine Luxury or Estate Home Builders
Build on land already owned. 
Build luxurious one-of-a-kind homes.  Work with celebrities and discerning clientele.
Collaborate with other professionals such as architect, interior designer, landscape architect.
Build single-family homes generally over 5000 sf.
Focus of home design is on client's lifestyle.  Features often include custom wood working, energy efficiency, aging in place, home automation, home security, etc.
Cost is usually the highest = $$$$$

Industry

Australia
The Construction Industry attributes to being the fourth largest contributor to GDP in Australian economy, employing 9.1% of the Australian workforce.

U.K.
Despite the economic recovery, house building is rapidly increasing. Housing construction grew for a 15th month in April, which is the longest period of growth 2006/07. According to The Times, 13,000 out of 200,000 homes built each year in the UK are self or custom built [April, 2019]. Since 2016, individuals in England have had the right to build their own bespoke home. The Right to Build requires local authorities in England to maintain a register of people who want to custom or self build in their area. This legislation was put in place to accelerate the growth of new housing by empowering consumers to create their ideal home built to their specification.

Within the UK there are several routes for custom homes such as serviced plots, customisable homes and collective custom build.

United States
In the United States, the home building industry accounts for $82 billion in revenue with an annual growth of 5.8%. The industry currently attributes to 398,391 employees over 163,843 Businesses.

Notes

External links
National Association of Home Builders NAHB.com, 2010.
Additional information  MuellerHomes.com, 2022

Construction
Housing